Taj Hotels is a chain of luxury hotels and a subsidiary of the Indian Hotels Company Limited, headquartered in Mumbai, India. Incorporated by Jamsetji Tata in 1902, the company is a part of the Tata Group, one of India's largest business conglomerates. The company employed over 20,000 people in the year 2010.

As of 2022, the company operates a total of 90 hotels and hotel-resorts, with 75 across India and 15 in other countries, including Bhutan, Maldives, Nepal, South Africa, Sri Lanka, UAE, UK, USA and Zambia.

History

Jamsetji Nusserwanji Tata, founder of the Tata Group, opened the Taj Mahal Palace, a hotel in Mumbai (formerly called Bombay) overlooking the Arabian Sea, on 16 December 1903. It was the first Taj property and the first Taj hotel. There are several anecdotal stories about why Tata opened the Taj hotel. According to a story, he decided to open the hotel after an incident involving racial discrimination at the Watson's Hotel in Mumbai, where he was refused entry as the hotel permitted only Europeans. Hotels that accepted only European guests were very common across British India then. According to another story, he opened the hotel when one of his friends expressed disgust over the hotels that were present in Bombay then. But a more plausible reason was advanced by Lovat Fraser, a close friend of the Tata and one of the early directors of the IHCL group, that the idea had long been in his mind and that he had made a study on the subject. He did not have any desire to own a hotel but he wanted to attract people to India and to improve Bombay. It is said that Jamsetji Tata had travelled to places like London, Paris, Berlin, and Düsseldorf to arrange for materials and pieces of art, furniture and other interior decor for his hotel.

In 1974, the group opened India's first international five-star deluxe beach resort, the Fort Aguada Beach Resort in Goa. In 1970s, the Taj Group also began its business in metropolitan hotels, opening the five-star deluxe hotel, Taj Coromandel in Chennai, in 1974, acquiring an equity interest and operating contract for the Taj President (now Vivanta by Taj – President), a business hotel in Mumbai, in 1977, and also opening the Taj Mahal Hotel in Delhi in 1978.

The group has been converting royal palaces in India into luxury hotels since the 1970s. The first palace to be converted into a Taj luxury hotel was the Lake Palace in Udaipur, in 1971. Other examples include the Rambagh Palace in Jaipur, Umaid Bhawan Palace in Jodhpur, Falaknuma Palace in Hyderabad and Nadesar Palace in Varanasi.

In 1980, the Taj Group opened its first hotel outside India, the Taj Sheba Hotel in Sana'a, in Yemen and in the late 1980s, acquired interests in the St. James' Court Hotel (now comprising Taj 51 Buckingham Gate Suites and Residences and St. James' Court, A Taj Hotel) in London. In 1984, the Taj Group acquired, under a license agreement, each of the Taj West End in Bangalore, Taj Connemara, in Chennai and Savoy Hotel in Ooty. The five-star deluxe hotel, Taj Bengal in Kolkata, was opened in the year 1989, and with this, the Taj Group became the only hotel chain in India with a presence in the six major metropolitan cities of India, namely Mumbai, Delhi, Kolkata, Bangalore, Hyderabad, and Chennai.

Concurrently with the expansion of its luxury hotel chain in the major metropolitan cities, the Taj Group also expanded its business hotels division in the major metropolitan and large secondary cities in India. During the 1990s, the Taj Group continued to expand its geographic and market coverage in India. It developed specialized operations (such as wildlife lodges) and consolidated its position in established markets through the upgrading of existing properties and development of new properties. Taj also set up the Taj Kerala Hotels and Resorts Limited in the early 1990s along with the Kerala Tourism Development Corporation.

In 2005, The Pierre in New York City was acquired.

On 9 March 2022, Taj Exotica Resort & Spa, The Palm, Dubai, was opened. The hotel is the recent addition to The Taj Hotel group. Other properties of the group include Taj Jumeirah Lakes Towers Dubai and Taj Dubai.

Notable hotels

 Taj Mahal Palace Hotel, Mumbai
 Rambagh Palace, Jaipur
 Taj Lake Palace, Udaipur
 Umaid Bhawan Palace, Jodhpur
 Falaknuma Palace, Hyderabad
 Taj Coromandel in Chennai
 Taj West End in Bangalore
 Taj Fort Aguada Resort in Goa
 Taj Connemara in Chennai
 Taj Bengal in Kolkata
 Usha Kiran Palace in Gwalior
 Taj Club House Chennai in Chennai
 Taj Fisherman's Cove Resort & Spa in Chennai
 Vivanta by Taj—Surya in Coimbatore
 The Pierre in New York City
 Taj Samudra in Colombo
 Taj Tashi in Thimpu

Recognition
Ten hotels of the Taj Group are members of the Leading Hotels of the World. Two hotels of the Taj Group, namely Rambagh Palace in Jaipur and the Taj Mahal Palace Hotel in Mumbai, were ranked in 2013 by Condé Nast Traveler among its "Top 100 Hotels and Resorts in the World". Condé Nast Traveler also ranked the Taj Mahal Palace in Mumbai as number 13 on its list of "Gold Standard Hotels" in 2014.

Other ventures
 Institute of Hotel Management, Aurangabad – IHCL has been operating the Institute of Hotel Management at Aurangabad since 1993. The institute offers a four-year degree, designed with the help of faculty from the hospitality background with an affiliation to the University of Huddersfield in the United Kingdom. 
 Taj Air – IHCL operates Taj Air, an air charter company.

See also

References

External links

Companies based in Mumbai
 
Hotel chains in India
Hotels established in 1902
Indian brands
Indian companies established in 1902
Indian Hotels Company Limited